Those Who Love is a 1929 British drama film directed by H. Manning Haynes and starring Adele Blanche, William Freshman and Carol Goodner. It was based on the novel Mary Was Love by Guy Fletcher. Anna Neagle made her debut in the film, playing a small part.

Cast
 Adele Blanche ...  Mary / Lorna
 William Freshman ...  David Mellor
 Lawson Butt ...  Joe
 Carol Goodner ...  Anne
 Hannah Jones ...  Babe
 Dino Galvani ...  Frenchman
 Anna Neagle ... Minor role

References

External links

1929 films
1929 drama films
Films shot at British International Pictures Studios
Films directed by H. Manning Haynes
British drama films
British black-and-white films
1920s English-language films
1920s British films